Perophora is a sea squirt genus in the family Perophoridae. Most species are found in shallow warm water but a few are found in higher latitudes. A colony consists of a number of zooids which bud off from a long slender stolon.

Characteristics
A Perophora colony consists of a system of stolons from which individual zooids arise at intervals. Each zooid has four or five rows of stigmata in the wall of the atrium, the one exception being Perophora multistigmata which has eight rows. In some cases, the five-rowed species have some stigmata extending over the first and second rows indicating that the primary number of rows is four. In Ecteinascidia, the only other genus in the family, there are always eight or more rows of stigmata, usually twelve to twenty rows. Other distinguishing characteristics are that Perophora has a horizontal gut loop with a short rectum and a testis with usually one, but up to four lobes, situated in the gut loop. In Ecteinascidia the gut loop is curved, the rectum long and the testis multi-lobed.

Species
The World Register of Marine Species lists the following species:

Perophora annectens Ritter, 1893
Perophora bermudensis Berrill, 1932
Perophora carpenteria Goodbody, 1994
Perophora clavata Kott, 1985
Perophora euphues (Sluiter, 1895)
Perophora hornelli Herdman, 1906
Perophora hutchisoni Macdonald, 1859
Perophora jacerens (Tokioka, 1954)
Perophora japonica Oka, 1927
Perophora listeri Wiegman, 1835
Perophora longicaulis Kott, 2003
Perophora modificata Kott, 1985
Perophora multiclathrata (Sluiter, 1904)
Perophora multistigmata Kott, 1952
Perophora namei Hartmeyer & Michaelsen, 1928
Perophora psammodes (Sluiter, 1895)
Perophora regina Goodbody & Cole, 1987
Perophora sabulosa Kott, 1990
Perophora sagamiensis Tokioka, 1953
Perophora tokarae
Perophora virgulata Monniot, 1997
Perophora viridis Verrill, 1871

References

External links 

Enterogona
Tunicate genera